Remixploitation is the first remix album from guitarist John 5 (ex-Marilyn Manson/Rob Zombie) released on February 14, 2009.

Track listing

Credits
John 5 – guitars, bass, banjo
Tommy Clufetos – drums
Jeff Mc Donogh – remixed tracks 1, 4
Bob Marlette – remixed tracks 2, 5, 7, 9
Chris Baseford – remixed tracks 3, 6
Sid Riggs – remixed tracks 8, 10
Neil Zlozower – cover photo
Piggy D – graphic design
Gabrielle Geiselman – additional photos
Mark Friedman – management
VQPR Nancy Sayle – publicity

Trivia
 The cover for Remixploiation is based on the artwork for The Jimi Hendrix Experience's Electric Ladyland. This was one of several covers that was released, although not the original idea from Hendrix.  John 5 has long been a fan of Jimi Hendrix, citing him as one of his influences. In fact John 5 contributed a track to the Jimi Hendrix tribute album Hazy Dreams back in 2003.
"Eat It Up" was claimed to be the only original, new track on the album by the site administrator for John-5.com: "Another question from my talk with John the other night – "Eat it Up" is the only original track on the album. It is not a remix of any of John's other works, but a stand-alone new track." However, the track appeared nine years prior as part of the soundtrack for the 2000 video game Carmageddon TDR 2000.
 Slightly different versions of "Plastic", "Eat it up" and "Shoot The Dog" appeared previously as part of the soundtrack for the 2000 video game Carmageddon TDR 2000, with "Plastic" being titled "Carma" and "Shoot the Dog" being titled "Dedicated to Hate".

Samples and explanation
 "Dorsia" is a remix of the track "Black Widow of La Porte" from 2007's The Devil Knows My Name and carries soundbites from the films American Psycho and Bride of Frankenstein. "Dorsia" is the name of a restaurant in New York that Bale's character Bateman, tries to get a reservation to in the movie American Psycho.

 "Monsters and Gods" is a remix of the track "Gods and Monsters" from the 2005 album Songs for Sanity.
 "Say Goodnight to Your Soul" is a remix of the tracks "Heretic's Fork" / "Noisemaker's Fife" from 2008's Requiem and features soundbites from the 1986 film Crossroads (for example "hellhounds on your trail boy!").
 "Unbelievers" is a remix of the track "Sounds of Impalement" also from Requiem and features soundbites from the film Rosemary's Baby. The track also contains excerpts from the horror movie Children of the Corn which is based on the Stephen King short story. Snippets include references to "he who walks among the rows".
 "Shoot the Dog" is an earlier version of "Needles, CA"  from the 2004 album Vertigo and features soundbites from the 1991 film Cape Fear and from a traditional song called "Little Rooster" sung by Almeda Riddle. To listen to the original recording click here .
 "2 Bullets" is a remix of "The Werewolf of Westeria" from the album The Devil Knows My Name and carries soundbites from the 1990 film Misery.
 "Plastic" is an earlier version of "Perineum" from the 2005 album Songs for Sanity.
 "How Do You Like It" is a remix of "The Washing Away of Wrong" from the album The Devil Knows My Name and features soundbites from The Shining with Jack Nicholson.

References

John 5 (guitarist) albums
2009 remix albums